The Renault R.S.18 is a Formula One racing car designed and constructed by the Renault Sport Formula One Team to compete during the 2018 FIA Formula One World Championship. The chassis was designed by Nick Chester, Chris Cooney, Martin Tolliday, and Pete Machin with Bob Bell overseeing the design and production of the car as a chief technical officer and Rémi Taffin leading the powertrain design. The car was driven by Nico Hülkenberg and Carlos Sainz Jr. The car made its competitive debut at the 2018 Australian Grand Prix.

Design and development
With the development of the R.S.18, the Enstone factory was expanded to accommodate the team's operations.

Competition history

Later use 
A modified R.S.18 was used during testing of the 2022 tyre compounds after the 2021 Abu Dhabi Grand Prix.

Complete Formula One results
(key) (results in bold indicate pole position; results in italics indicate fastest lap)

References

R.S.18
2018 Formula One season cars